Edward Dawson Atkinson,  (10 November 1891 – 1934) was a British military officer, aviator, and a flying ace of the First World War, credited with a total of 10 aerial victories while serving in three different squadrons. He would serve postwar in the Royal Air Force until invalided out due to ill health. He then turned to a business career.

Early life
Atkinson was the son of Joseph Henry Atkinson and Elizabeth Mary M'Carthy, and was born in Calcutta, India, on 10 November 1891, when it was still part of the British Empire. He became an officer in the 40th Pathans of the British Indian Army.

First World War
On 12 December 1915, Second Lieutenant Edward Dawson Atkinson of the 40th Pathans was awarded Royal Aero Club Aviator's Certificate no. 2145 after training at the London and Provincial School, Hendon.

On 25 January 1917, he was already a pilot officer; on that date, he was appointed flight commander and acting captain. Two months later, on 25 March, while serving in No. 1 Squadron on the Western Front, he used a Nieuport to destroy a German observation balloon. He drove down two enemy planes in April, an Albatros D.II fighter on the 22nd and an Albatros reconnaissance craft on the 29th. He would not score again for over a year.

Atkinson was reassigned to No. 56 Squadron, which was equipped with Royal Aircraft Factory SE.5as. On 3 May 1918, in conjunction with William Roy Irwin and Trevor Durrant, he destroyed a Rumpler in one dogfight, and drove another down out of control 20 minutes later. Atkinson was now an ace.

A transfer to No. 64 Squadron quickly ensued. Still flying a SE.5a, Atkinson ran off a string of five more victories during the last week of May 1918. His final count came to a balloon and four enemy planes destroyed, and five more enemy planes driven down out of control while he was in France.

On 2 July 1918, Atkinson was awarded the Distinguished Flying Cross for his exploits. It would be announced in the London Gazette on 3 August 1918:

Post-war
On 1 January 1919, Atkinson was awarded the Air Force Cross. He remained in service during the postwar demobilization. On 14 September 1923, he was assigned to aviation duty in Iraq; records disagree as to whether he served with either No. 8 Squadron RAF or No. 84 Squadron RAF.

Shortly thereafter, on 1 January 1924, he was promoted to squadron leader. On 25 May 1924, he was given command of No. 1 Squadron in Iraq.

He then returned to England; on 2 April 1926 he was posted to RAF Uxbridge as a transfer to Home Establishment. He was still tasked as Commanding Officer of 1 Squadron before November 1926, when it was drawn down from Iraq in cadre status, and then returned to England; it is unknown whether this was a continuing appointment or a reappointment.

He was the commanding officer again (or still) on 11 April 1927, in time to lead No. 1 Squadron for manoeuvres in late July and early August 1927.

On 2 January 1928, he was again posted to RAF Uxbridge. On 1 September 1928, he was posted to No. 21 Group RAF HQ, RAF West Drayton.

On 1 August 1930, he was once again posted to RAF Uxbridge.

On 21 October 1930, Atkinson was placed on half pay, Scale A. He remained in this status until 16 March 1931, when he was restored to full pay and posted to No. 10 Group RAF HQ at RAF Lee-on-Solent.

On 18 January 1932, Edward Dawson Atkinson was invalided into retirement from the Royal Air Force.

On 29 March 1934, he was chairman of R. J. Barnett & Coley Limited in New Malden, Surrey, when it was voluntarily liquidated. Atkinson was one of the two appointed liquidators.

Nothing is known of him after that.

References

1891 births
British World War I flying aces
Royal Air Force personnel of World War I
1934 deaths
Recipients of the Air Force Cross (United Kingdom)
Military personnel of British India
British Indian Army officers
Indian Army personnel of World War I
British people in colonial India